Shirkovo is a rural locality in Kosteltsevsky Selsoviet Rural Settlement, Kurchatovsky District, Kursk Oblast, Russia. Population:

Geography 

 Climate
Shirkovo has a warm-summer humid continental climate (Dfb in the Köppen climate classification).

Transport 
Shirkovo is located 23 km from the federal route  Crimea Highway, 22 km from the road of regional importance  (Kursk – Lgov – Rylsk – border with Ukraine), 20.5 km from the road  (Lgov – Konyshyovka), on the road of intermunicipal significance  (38K-017 – Nikolayevka – Shirkovo), 22 km from the nearest railway halt Kurchatow (railway line Lgov I — Kursk).

References

Notes

Sources

Rural localities in Kurchatovsky District, Kursk Oblast